John "Jack" Traynor (born March 17, 1987, in St. Charles, Missouri) is an American former soccer player.

Career

College and Amateur
Traynor attended Francis Howell North High School in St. Charles, Missouri and played college soccer at the University of Notre Dame, where he was named to the College Soccer News `100 Freshmen to Watch' list, and was named a Big East Academic All-Star as a junior.

Professional
Traynor was drafted in the second round (29th overall) of the 2009 MLS SuperDraft by the New York Red Bulls, but was not offered a contract by the team.

After an unsuccessful trial with Aalesunds FK in Norway, Traynor signed with Miami FC of the USL First Division. He made his professional debut on April 26, 2009, coming on as a substitute in Miami's game against Rochester Rhinos. On February 12, 2010, he signed with AC St. Louis

Following St. Louis folding after their one and only season in 2010, Traynor signed a multi-year contract with new USL Pro club Orlando City on March 15, 2011. Traynor spent only the 2011 season in Orlando, helping the club win the USL Pro championship, before signing with USL side Rochester Rhinos on November 28, 2011.

Personal
Jack's brother, Will Traynor, is also a professional soccer player.

Honours

Orlando City
USL Pro (1): 2011

References

External links
 AC St. Louis bio
 Miami FC bio
 Notre Dame bio

1987 births
Living people
AC St. Louis players
American soccer players
Association football defenders
Miami FC (2006) players
New York Red Bulls draft picks
Notre Dame Fighting Irish men's soccer players
Orlando City SC (2010–2014) players
People from St. Charles, Missouri
Rochester New York FC players
Soccer players from Missouri
USL Championship players
USL First Division players
USSF Division 2 Professional League players